Cheshire, formerly known as New Cheshire Parish, is a town in New Haven County, Connecticut, United States. At the time of the 2020 census, the population of Cheshire was 28,733.  The center of population of Connecticut is located in Cheshire.

History
Cheshire, Connecticut was first settled in 1694 as part of Wallingford, Connecticut. It was then known as New Cheshire Parish. After many attempts in securing their independence from Wallingford, New Cheshire Parish was granted secession and was later incorporated as a town in May 1780 as Cheshire. The name is a transfer from Cheshire, in England.

Prospect, Connecticut, was formerly part of Cheshire before 1829, and was then known as Columbia Parish.

Preparedness shelter 
Cheshire has a Cold War-era fallout shelter constructed in 1966, located underneath the local AT&T tower.

Cheshire home invasion trial 
During a July 23, 2007 home invasion in Cheshire (see Cheshire, Connecticut, home invasion murders), a mother and her two daughters were murdered, leaving the father of the family as the sole survivor. The murder and the aftermath was featured in a segment that aired on the NBC-TV news magazine show Dateline NBC on October 5, 2010.

Demographics

As of the census of 2020, there were 28,733 people, 10,169 households, and 7,562 families residing in the town. The racial makeup of the town was 81.07% White, 4.40% African American, 0.07% Native American, 6.24% Asian, 0.01% Pacific Islander, 2.70% from other races, and 5.50% from two or more races. Hispanic or Latino of any race were 6.33% of the population. The largest ethnic groups in the town are Italian Americans and Irish Americans.

There were 10,169 households, out of which 23.7% had children under the age of 18 living with them, 64.8% were married couples living together, 19.2% had a female householder with no husband present, and 25.64% were non-families. 21.39% of all households were made up of individuals, and 9.4% had someone living alone who was 65 years of age or older.  The average household size was 2.62 and the average family size was 3.04.

In the town, the population was spread out, with 19.4% under the age of 18, 5.9% from 20 to 24, 20.1% from 25 to 44, 33.5% from 45 to 64, and 18.6% who were 65 years of age or older.  The median age was 46.2 years. For every 100 females, there were 113.9 males.  For every 100 females age 18 and over, there were 110.3 males.

In 2019, the median household income was $120,546 and the per capita income was $52,013. About 1.6% of families and 3.0% of the population were below the poverty line, including 3.1% of those under age 18 and 4.3% of those age 65 or over.

The central area of the town is a census-designated place identified as Cheshire Village. As of the 2020 census, Cheshire Village had a population of 6,499.

Geography

Environment 

Cheshire is situated in the midst of several major cities of Connecticut. Cheshire shares borders with Southington on the north and northeast, Meriden on the northeast, Wallingford on the east, Hamden on the south, Bethany for a short distance on the southwest, Prospect on the west, Waterbury on the northwest, and Wolcott on the northwest

Climate

Politics

Cheshire's voters have split tickets frequently in recent statewide elections. In 2004, President Bush won a narrow plurality over John Kerry. Bush had lost the town in his 2000 bid. In 2006 Cheshire voters gave strong support to Republican Governor M. Jodi Rell, independent U.S. Senate candidate Joe Lieberman and local Democratic House candidate Chris Murphy, who defeated incumbent Nancy Johnson.  In the 2008 presidential election, the town's voters supported Democrat Barack Obama with 8,177 votes over Republican John McCain with 6,839 votes. Voting tallies for the 2016 presidential election are as follows: Hillary Clinton (D) 7,572, Donald Trump (R) 7,105, Gary Johnson (L) 538, and Jill Stein (G) 189.

Cheshire voted for Republican majorities to its Board of Selectmen every election from 1915 to 1971, and then to its Town Council every year from 1973 to 2001, when voters elected a Democratic majority (6–3) for the first time.  In 2003, a Republican majority (5–4) was elected.  A Democratic majority (5–4) was elected in 2005, then reelected (5–4) in 2007.  In the 2009 local elections, Cheshire voters ousted the Democratic majority on the Town Council and elected 8 Republicans and 1 Democrat, though due to local minority representation rules, only 7 Republicans were seated.

Arts and culture

Museums and other points of interest
The Barker Character, Comic and Cartoon Museum, located in the northern section of Cheshire, holds a large collection of memorabilia, novelties and ephemera such as lunch boxes and Pez dispensers bearing the likenesses of characters from television, cartoons and comics.

National Register of Historic Places
 Cheshire Historic District — Roughly bounded by Main Street, Highland Avenue, Wallingford Road, South Main, Cornwall, and Spring streets (added September 29, 1986)
 Farmington Canal Lock (Lock 12) — 487 N. Brooksvale Road (added March 16, 1973)
 First Congregational Church of Cheshire — 111 Church Drive (added March 16, 1973)
 Marion Historic District (added December 21, 1988)

Parks and recreation

The Farmington Canal Heritage Trail, a popular non-motorized recreational trail, runs through Cheshire along its route between Suffield, Connecticut, to the north and New Haven, Connecticut, to the south.

The Hitchcock-Phillips House, a historic home, is located in town.

Roaring Brook Falls along the Quinnipiac Trail in the southwest corner of town is Connecticut's tallest single drop waterfall, and is owned by the Cheshire Land Trust.

Community parks and recreational facilities in town include:

Cheshire Park, a 75-acre park geared towards active recreation
Bartlem Recreational Area, a park with a playscape, skate park and picnic area.
Mixville Recreation Area, offering winter sledding, swimming, and fishing at Mixville Pond
Cheshire Community Pool, a swimming facility which was renovated in 2016 to offer a year-round, indoor pool.

Education

Cheshire, a part of Cheshire Public Schools, is home to one public high school, Cheshire High School, and one public middle school, Dodd Middle School. There are four public elementary schools: Chapman, Doolittle, Highland, and Norton Elementary.

There are also several private and alternative schools in the town, including Cheshire Academy (originally the Episcopal Academy of Connecticut), which was founded in Cheshire in 1794 and currently educates students in the Upper School (grades 9–12/Post-Graduate Year). St. Bridgets is a Catholic school in Cheshire for grades preschool to 8th grade. Humiston is an alternative high school in Cheshire.

The Legion of Christ, a Roman Catholic congregation, runs their novitiate and college of humanities on a  complex on Oak Avenue. About 100 seminarians undergo two to four years of training for the priesthood there, including religious formation and classical humanities.

Transportation

Transportation within Cheshire is largely by car. Interstate 691 skirts the northern edge of the town.  Interstate 84 passes through the northwest part of the town. The main north–south artery is Connecticut Route 10, a difficult passage that is busy, sometimes congested, and includes many stoplights.  There are two east–west routes: Route 42 and Route 68/Route 70. Route 10 is by far the busiest road in Cheshire, with the worst Route 10 traffic occurring between Routes 68/70 and Route 42 every weekday during the morning commute, evening commute, and after the high school gets out at 2 pm. West Main Street and Main Street, Route 68/70 between Route 10 and Waterbury Road, is the next busiest road in town. The intersection of Route 10 and Route 68/70 is the busiest intersection in town. The second busiest intersection is the Cheshire High School and Route 10 intersection right before school starts and right after school ends.

The 229 line of Connecticut Transit New Haven which runs from Waterbury to New Haven travels through Cheshire on Routes 70 and 10.  A commuter express bus also runs from the commuter lot near Interstate 84 to Hartford.

Prison system
Cheshire is home to two large state prison facilities located in the northern section of town. The larger of these facilities is the Cheshire Correctional Institution, which opened in 1913. In 1982, the Manson Youth Institution opened adjacent to the CCI. These prisons explain the city's skewed male/female ratios. The larger of these prisons is located across the street from Chapman Elementary School, separated by Route 10.

Notable people

 Amos Bronson Alcott (1799–1888), schoolmaster 
 Brad Ausmus, professional baseball player and MLB manager
 Harvey C. Barnum, Jr., Medal of Honor recipient
 Henry Washington Benham (1813–1884), Union army general
 Chris Berman, ESPN sportscaster
 Jay Bontatibus, actor
 Albert E. Burke (1919–1999), professor and pioneer of educational television
 Sabrina Cass, Olympic skier
 John Chamberlain (1903–1995), journalist
 Michael Chasen, co-founder and CEO of ClassEDU and co-founder of Blackboard Inc.
 Sean Clements, podcaster, producer. Famous for "Santaman" character
Martha Coolidge, film director
 Amos Doolittle (1754–1832), engraver of Battle of Concord scenes
 Eliakim Doolittle (1772–1850), composer
 George Henry Durrie, painter
 Elizabeth Esty, U.S. Congresswoman
 Samuel A. Foot (1780–1846),  28th Governor of Connecticut, United States Representative and United States Senator
 Seabury Ford (1801–1855),  20th Governor of Ohio
 Matt Generous, ice hockey defenseman
 James J. Greco, businessman, lived in town from 1992 to 2011
 Sunil Gulati, President of the United States Soccer Federation
 Peter Hitchcock (1781–1854), judge
 John Holmstrom, cartoonist, writer
 John Frederick Kensett (1816–1872), painter
 Brian Leetch, ice hockey defenseman and Hockey Hall of Fame inductee
 Rollin Carolas Mallary,  U.S. Representative from Vermont
 Legs McNeil, journalist, rock music historian
 J. P. Morgan, businessman
 Chris Murphy, U.S. Senator
 Anjul Nigam, actor
 Marc Tyler Nobleman, author
 Ron Palillo, actor
 Paul Pasqualoni, athletic coach
 Lonnie Quinn, meteorologist
 Ramamurti Shankar physicist
 Edward Tufte, professor
 Justin Tussing, novelist
 Vijay Vaitheeswaran, journalist
 James Van Der Beek, actor

See also

References

External links

Town of Cheshire official website
Cheshire Public Library – The library has a Cheshire/Connecticut history section and will answer genealogical and historical questions about Cheshire and environs.
First Congregational Church – Host of the Annual Strawberry Festival and "mother church" to other congregations in the area and along the Eastern Seaboard. The church steeple is an official symbol of the town, as it is depicted on the town seal.
Barker Character, Comic and Cartoon Museum
Saint Peter's Church
Money Magazine 2011
Cheshirepedia – Information on Cheshire's history and culture.

 
Towns in New Haven County, Connecticut
Towns in the New York metropolitan area
Towns in Connecticut